Alfred William Clarke (1914–1953) was a Welsh amateur football inside left who played in the Football League for Newport County. He was capped by Wales at amateur level.

References 

Welsh footballers
English Football League players
Wales amateur international footballers
Association football inside forwards
1914 births
Footballers from Newport, Wales
Newport County A.F.C. players
Lovell's Athletic F.C. players
Western Football League players
1953 deaths
Place of death missing